Mariano Lara (born 25 February 1951) is a Costa Rican sports shooter. He competed at the 1980 Summer Olympics, the 1984 Summer Olympics and the 1988 Summer Olympics.

References

1951 births
Living people
Costa Rican male sport shooters
Olympic shooters of Costa Rica
Shooters at the 1980 Summer Olympics
Shooters at the 1984 Summer Olympics
Shooters at the 1988 Summer Olympics
People from Alajuela
20th-century Costa Rican people